The Curtiss XBTC was a prototype single-seat, single-engined torpedo/dive bomber developed during World War II for the United States Navy. Four aircraft were ordered, powered by two different engines, but the two aircraft to be fitted with the Wright R-3350 radial engine were cancelled in late 1942, leaving only the pair using the Pratt & Whitney R-4360 radial. By this time, Curtiss Aircraft was overwhelmed with work and the Navy gave the XBTC-2 prototypes a low priority which delayed progress so the first flight did not take place until the beginning of 1945. One aircraft crashed in early 1947 and the other was disposed of later that year.

Design and development

In the 1930s and early 1940s, the Navy divided carrier-borne bombers into two types: the torpedo bomber and the dive bomber, each with crews of two or three men. Wartime experience showed that pilots could aim bombs and torpedoes without assistance from other crewmembers as well as navigate with the aid of radio beacons and the development of more powerful engines meant that faster aircraft no longer needed a rear gunner for self-defense. Furthermore, the consolidation of the two types of bombers greatly increased the flexibility of a carrier's air group and allowed the number of fighters in an air group to be increased.

In January 1942 the Navy issued a specification to replace the prewar two-seat, carrier-capable VSB (Scout Bomber) aircraft with a single-seat aircraft that used the 2,200 hp (1,641 kW) Wright R-3350 radial engine. The aircraft was required to be armed with four  autocannon and be capable of dive-bombing and torpedo attacks. It was to be provided with an internal bomb bay with space for two  bombs or a Mark 13 torpedo hung below the fuselage. Curtiss responded with their Model 96 which was a low-wing monoplane with retractable conventional landing gear with the R-3350 and proposed an alternate powered by the heavier  Pratt & Whitney R-4360 radial that would use contra-rotating propellers to handle the extra horsepower. The Navy agreed to both and issued a letter of intent in late June for two aircraft equipped with the R-3350, the XBTC-1 (BT reflecting its new role), and another pair fitted with the R-4360, the XBTC-2. Due to development and production difficulties with the high-priority SB2C Helldiver dive bomber, along with the SO3C Seamew and SC Seahawk scout and observation floatplanes, the Navy only awarded a contract for the two XBTC-2 prototypes on 31 December and gave them a low priority.

Little documentation about the early development of the XBTC-2 has survived, but photographs of the mockup dated December are available. They show the larger engine installation of the XR-4360-8A and the contra-rotating propellers, but the mockup may have been reworked from the C-1 as it lacks the larger empennage that would be necessary to handle the more powerful engine. The prototypes had a fuel capacity of  housed in two interconnected  fuselage tanks and a pair of interconnected  combination wing and fuselage tanks. The two wing hardpoints were plumbed to handle . An additional  fuel tank could be fitted in the bomb bay. All control surfaces were skinned with metal and the aircraft was fitted with a set of dive brakes on the upper and lower surfaces of the inner wing panel as well as slotted flaps along its trailing edge. The outer wing panels were equipped with leading-edge slats and had 10° dihedral.

To improve landing performance the aircraft intended to be fitted with "duplex" (slotted) flaps, but wind-tunnel tests revealed problems with the flaps so two different outer wing panels were developed, both. Its leading edge was perpendicular to the fuselage centerline and its trailing edge followed the taper of the inner wing panel. It was fitted with an aileron that started at the tip and extended inwards for about 3/4s of the panel's span; the remaining space was used by ordinary slotted flaps. It was also equipped with another pair of dive brakes. The "Model B" panel reversed the relationship of the leading and trailing edges. Its aileron occupied the entire trailing edge and the "duplex" flaps were positioned on the underside of the wing, just ahead of the aileron. In use, they were lowered to create space for air to reach the underside of the ailerons.

The armament of the XBTC-2s consisted of four 20 mm autocannon, each with 200 rounds. The bomb bay contained a single shackle that could handle ordnance up 1,600 pounds in weight. In a dive, the bomb was swung clear of the propeller on a H-shaped trapeze prior to release. A  torpedo (such as the Mark 13) could be mounted on the bomb bay doors, although nothing could be dropped from the bomb bay in that case. The wing hardpoints were stressed to carry weapons weighing up to 1,000 pounds.

Development and construction of the two prototypes was delayed by the low priority given to the program by the Navy, so the aircraft did not make its first flight until 20 January 1945. It was fitted with a pre-production XR-4360-8A engine and the "Model A" wing. Although the second aircraft equipped with a production R-4360-14 engine and the "Model B" wing, both prototypes were initially fitted with  Curtiss Electric propellers, but they were replaced by  Aeroproducts AD7562 propellers sometime after a landing accident with the first prototype on 3 March. The aircraft was repaired and was later fitted with a "Model B" wing. They were delivered to the Naval Air Test Center at Naval Air Station Patuxent River, Maryland, on 30 July 1946. The second prototype crashed during stall testing when its engine failed on 17 March 1947. The surviving prototype was transferred to the Naval Air Material Unit in August for disposal.

The United States Army Air Forces assigned the designation A-40 to a proposed 'de-navalized' version of the XBTC; however, it later decided not to acquire any further single-engine attack aircraft and the project was cancelled.

Variants
 Curtiss XBTC-1: Wright R-3350 Duplex-Cyclone engine
 Curtiss XBTC-2: Pratt & Whitney R-4360 Wasp Major engine

Operators

 United States Navy

Specifications (XBTC-2)

See also

References

Notes

Bibliography
Andrews, Hal. "XBTC-2". Naval Aviation News. November–December 1987. pp. 16–17. 
 Bowers, Peter M. Curtiss Aircraft 1907–1947. London: Putnam, 1979. .
 Breihan, John R., Stan Piet & Roger S. Mason. Martin Aircraft, 1909–1960. Santa Ana, California: Narkiewicz/Thompson, 1995. 
Kowalski, Bob. Curtiss XBTC-2 "Eggbeater" (Naval Fighters, Number 77). Simi Valley, California: Steve Ginter, 2007 
Wagner, Ray. American Combat Airplanes of the 20th Century: A Comprehensive Reference. Reno, Nevada: Jack Bacon & Co., 2004.

Further reading

BT01C
1940s United States attack aircraft
Single-engined tractor aircraft
Low-wing aircraft
Aircraft with contra-rotating propellers
Carrier-based aircraft
World War II torpedo bombers of the United States
Aircraft first flown in 1945